The Bermuda Gazette was a Bermudian English-language weekly newspaper.  Published from 1784 to 1803 by Joseph Stockdale (and by his three daughters from 1803 to 1816), it was Bermuda's first newspaper. In 1782, the Bermudian Legislature arranged for a printing press, and brought Stockdale from England to run it.

Joseph Stockdale and the newspaper were honoured on Bermuda stamps in 1984 on the 200th anniversary of Bermuda's postal service and newspaper.

See also

 List of newspapers in Bermuda
 Featherbed Alley Printshop

References

Weekly newspapers
English-language newspapers published in North America
St. George's, Bermuda
Newspapers published in Bermuda
Publications established in 1784
1784 establishments in the British Empire
Publications disestablished in 1816
1816 disestablishments in the British Empire